The Nissan Laurel is a front-engine, rear-drive two- and four-door sedan manufactured and marketed by Nissan from 1969 to 2002. Introduced in 1968 as a new model positioned above the 1968 Datsun Bluebird 510, the Laurel offered the luxury of the Nissan Cedric 130 in a smaller size. In Japan, the Laurel was marketed solely as a Nissan model, rather than a Datsun model.

The first Laurel was developed by the Nissan Tsurumi R&D Division and assembled at the Musashimurayama Plant of the former Prince Motor Company in 2-door and 4-door variants. Released as a Nissan after Prince merged with Nissan, Laurels shared many components and architectures with the Skyline range. The Laurel was not marketed new in Japan at Nissan Prince Shop locations that sold the Skyline and Gloria, former Prince products. Instead the Laurel was sold at Nissan Motor Shop as the junior model to the larger V8-powered Nissan President.

Since 1968, eight generations of Laurel have been manufactured in Japan. Nissan intermittently listed the Laurel for sale in various Asian and European markets (it was also sold in Chile, Panama and other South American markets as the Datsun Laurel or Datsun 200l included  Argentina, starting in the late seventies), and then mostly discontinued the export of this model from 1989.

The Laurel was cancelled subsequent to Nissan's  alliance with Renault.


First generation (C30; 1968–1972) 

In April 1968 Nissan presented its new Laurel in four-door deLuxe and Super deLuxe versions, both equipped with a 1.8 L inline-four engine and independent rear suspension. In June 1970 a two-door hardtop coupé joined the lineup, as a junior version of the all-new Nissan Cedric/Gloria coupe, and one year later a 2000 cc engine became available in the four-door sedan as well. Its competitors at introduction were the Toyota Corona Mark II sedan, the Isuzu Bellel, and the Mazda Luce which was introduced in 1966. The Laurel did not sell as well as expected, largely because the design was too similar to that of the smaller, cheaper Bluebird (510) which was developed as a competitor before Nissan bought Prince.

This car was developed by the Nissan Tsurumi vehicle development team, but the C30 Laurel was fitted with the Prince four-cylinder SOHC engine, the G18 of 1,815 cc capacity. Conversely, the GC10 Skyline 2000GT was developed by the former Prince Ogikubo vehicle development team but was fitted with Nissan's L20 six-cylinder SOHC engine. The suspension is the same four-wheel independent system that was fitted on the C10 Skyline.
 
The Laurel Hardtop model was equipped with the SOHC 1,990 cc  G20-series four-cylinders. The four-door sedan was originally only available with the lesser G18. The SU twin-carburetted 2000GX received sporty equipment.
 
August 1970 saw the release of a modified version of the four-door sedan version, now with the same roof angle as that of the hard top. The instrument panel received redesigned panel meters, and the more luxurious GL grade was added.

Second generation (C130; 1972–1977) 

 
In April 1972 the second Laurel generation appeared, again in four-door saloon and two-door hardtop coupé form affectionately known as the Butaketsu Laurel ("pig butt") because of its ample rear quarter panels and tail section, with the taillights incorporated into the rear bumper. The saloon now was endowed with a rear beam axle and leaf springs, while the coupé clung to independent rear suspension. In addition to the 1.8 and 2.0 L four-cylinder engines, a 2.0 L inline-six was now available, joined, from October, 1973, by a 2.6 L six; the latter was replaced by a 2.8 L six in late 1975. The G-20 4-cylinder and L20 six-cylinder engines were equipped with SU twin carburetors but were eliminated February 1976 due to emission regulations.

The styling of the coupe appears to be influenced by the 1970 Ford Torino and the 1971 Mercury Cougar, reflecting a popular styling trend during the 1960s and 1970s called "coke bottle". Sales in Japan (very few were exported) ran to about 96,000 per year, with three-quarters sedans. The Toyota competitor was the Mark II coupé and sedan.

Engines available at the time were the four-cylinder 1815 cc G18 and 1990 cc G20, and the six-cylinder 1998 cc L20. Both the G20 and L20 were available with twin SU carburettors as an option. However, only the G20 equipped cars outwardly announced this with a "Twin Carburettor 2000GX" badge.

In October 1973 the first Laurel with the 2565 cc L26 six-cylinder engine was added and badged as "2600SGL". Since the engine was over two litres, it was not restrained by the size limits imposed by Japanese regulations, and therefore it was fitted with bigger bumpers than regular Laurels. The installation of the 2.6-litre engine in Japanese models helped identify this generation as a luxury car, as the larger engine obligated Japanese drivers to pay higher amounts of annual road tax.

In September 1975, in order to meet the new emissions regulations for that year, the L26 was replaced by the larger yet 2753 cc L28 six-cylinder. By October the carburettors in the L20 were replaced with electronic fuel injection and the engine was now dubbed L20E. Because of the difficulty in meeting the emissions regulations, the twin-carburetted engines were all discontinued. The 1,770 cc L18 replaced the G18 in the lineup.

In February 1976 carburetted 1.8-litre and 2.0-litre engines which met the 1976 emissions regulations were introduced, and were identified with the Nissan NAPS badge.

Laurel C130-EV
In 1974 Nissan developed an electric passenger sedan based on the Nissan Laurel. The Nissan Laurel C130-EV - referred to as the Datsun 200L-EV in export markets - developed to be used by the VIPs at the 1975 International Oceanographic Exposition in Okinawa. It was originally engineered by the Prince Motor Company, but produced by Nissan when the company assumed Prince operations in 1966.

The C130-EV uses one  electric motor, rear-mounted and driving the rear axle through a two-speed automatic transmission. Nissan's next electric car venture would be the 1998 Altra.

Third generation (C230; 1977–1980) 

The third generation appeared in January 1977. For the first time, the C230 was available in either saloon and hardtop coupé form, but also as a hardtop saloon without B-posts. The hardtop was only available with six-cylinder engines. Buyers could choose between a 1.8-litre four, a 2.0-litre inline-six (carburetted or fuel-injected, a first for the Laurel), a 2.8-litre six, or a 2.0-litre diesel four, sourced from Nissan Diesel as an alternative to the diesel-powered Toyota Mark II and the Isuzu Florian. Transmissions were mainly four- or five-speed manuals or a three-speed automatic, although a three-speed manual with a column shift was also available in the lower spec and commercial versions. In the autumn of 1978 the C230 received a mild facelift (type C231), marked visually by squared instead of round double headlights. The Toyota competitor was the Mark II coupé and sedan. Again, comfort was prioritized over handling and agility.

One year later (January 1978) Nissan released a tenth anniversary edition, which adopted a special deep red body color known as "Laurel's Crimson", as well as trim-specific emblems, aluminum wheels and front grille. In 1979 the 2.4-litre L24 engine was added to the lineup. European outputs were  DIN for the 2.0 and the 2.4 inline-sixes. European buyers were attracted to the Laurel for its overall reliability, low price, and ample equipment. Datsun-Nissan South Africa also developed a two-litre four-cylinder option not offered elsewhere to suit local needs with a lower-cost, torquier engine than the two-litre six sold elsewhere. The L20B engine offered  and was paired with somewhat lower equipment than the  280L sold alongside it.

November 1978 brought minor changes to the Laurel, including squaring off of the front headlights. The highest trim level, "Medalist", received air conditioning in addition to its OHC four-cylinder two-litre diesel engine. The 1800 cc cars switched to the newer Z18 crossflow engine and all Laurels now met the Showa 53 (1979) gasoline vehicle emission regulations.
 
Later, in October 1979, a two-litre four-cylinder gasoline option (Z20-series) was added in several markets. Also new were the options of automatic transmission and the SGL equipment grade on diesel vehicles.
 

In February 1980 an electric sunroof was added to the hardtop version of the Medalist. This was the first year in which a sunroof was a model option.
 
In July 1980 a special limited edition "gold medalist" top-of-the-line trim was released.

Fourth generation (C31; 1980–1984) 

The C31 model, introduced in November 1980, was the first model that was only available in a four-door form, either as a sedan or hardtop. Engines for the C31 were 1.8-liter, 2.0-liter L20, 2.4-liter L24 gasoline, and 2.8-liter diesel. The coupé was replaced by the new Nissan Leopard F30. The Toyota competitor was the Cresta hardtop and the Chaser sedan. November 1982 saw the introduction of the Limited "Givenchy Version" with Hubert de Givenchy doing the TV commercials in Japan, borrowing a marketing concept for an American luxury coupe, the Lincoln Continental Mark IV. In 1981, the Nissan Laurel Spirit was offered as a smaller alternative to the Laurel, while still offering the luxury content of the larger car.

Development Supervisor, Itirou Makoto Sakurai, was in charge of developing the Laurel together with the Skyline. The Laurel's redesign was carried out in a European style and tone. The coefficient of drag (Cd value) of the four-door hardtop is 0.38. The lowest-priced Z18 is a four-cylinder engine, as is the 2-litre Z20. The L20-series are inline-six cylinder models, also available in fuel injected L20E type, and as the turbocharged L20ET - the first turbocharged Laurel. On top of the lineup was the 2.8-litre L28E, and for some export markets the 2.4-litre L24 engine (usually carburetted) was also offered. Mostly for commercial use there was the four-cylinder LD20 diesel engine, while private users usually preferred the larger six-cylinder LD28 type which was also available with much better equipment.

In February 1981 the GX trim level was added. L20E sedan with independent rear suspension in the vehicle suspension formula (a six-link independent rear suspension was equipped as standard on the turbocharged cars). In November 1981 the car received some improvement and the Turbo Medalist model was new to the lineup.

In September 1982 there was a minor change. Up a sense of luxury and large-scale extrusion in the chrome bumpers and rear license plate holder. The tail lamp design was changed as well. Instead of the Z18 series engine, the new OHC four-cylinder 1809 cc CA18S engine was fitted to the Laurel 1.8. The engine range was overhauled at the time and now included the CA18S, L20E, turbocharged L20ET, the four-cylinder SOHC Z20S, and the diesel LD20 and LD28-6 models. The carburetted L20, the L28E, and the column-shifted LD20 (six-seater) were discontinued. The six-cylinder gasoline-powered car with automatic transmission and Super Touring equipment received an overdrive gear at the same time.

In November 1982 the Givenchy limited version was released. In February 1983 the "50 Special" released. In March the Givenchy II version went on sale. In May another 50 Special II vehicles were launched. In July electrically retractable fender and door mirrors were introduced, a first. In October, taxi and driver instruction vehicles with an OHC LPG four-cylinder engine (Z18P, Standard or GL equipment) were added. SGL Grand Touring car (with a hubcap for Medalist colored bumper and large) and 50 Special Release III.

January 1984 saw the abolition of the 1.8-litre GL models, while the Givenchy III limited edition also went on sale.

A fuel injected 2.4 with  later appeared for some markets. The 2.4-liter six only developed  in Swedish-market petrol cars as a result of that country's stringent emissions standards. As large Japanese cars are not very popular with private buyers in Europe, the diesel saw the lion's share of sales, mainly for taxi usage. Fitted with a detuned version of the L24 engine, the Laurel was introduced to the Middle Eastern (mainly Saudi) market in 1982.

Fifth generation (C32; 1984–1989) 

In October 1984 the C32 Laurel was released. Osamu Ito, Development Supervisor of the R31/32 Skyline, was assigned to redesign the Laurel. He saw the car needed significant changes, and set about doing so. Some of the Laurel's new features included a 4-door sedan body, variations in the hardtop, an angular design (including a strong push), and the world's first electric retractable door mirrors. The C32 was the last model to be sold in Europe, where the Laurel was replaced by the Nissan Maxima which was not available as a diesel and had a sportier, more luxurious air. The Laurel was often used as a taxi in Germany.

The C32 were fitted with a variety of gasoline engines, inline-fours and V6 engines ranging from 1.8 to 3.0 liters. Some engines, like the L24 and the electronically carburetted VG30S were reserved for export. The C32 Laurel also came with the LD28 diesel. In 1987 there were a minor facelift which basically were bigger bumpers, new grilles, and new lights in the front and back. The LD28 diesel engine were swapped out in favor of the similarly dimensioned RD28. This generation was the first Laurel to be equipped with a V6 engine.
 
The styling of the Nissan Laurel began to resemble the larger Nissan Cedric and Nissan Gloria but on a slightly smaller platform, with reduced tax liability based on the vehicles dimensions. The Toyota competitor was the Cresta hardtop and the Chaser sedan, and in 1986 the Honda Vigor.

The RB20E engine was equipped with six-cylinder series SOHC2.0L, VG20ET-SOHC2.0L V6 turbo, CA18S-series four-cylinder (LPG and specifications), LD28-series 6-cylinder diesel SOHC2.8L. The car's system also integrated a C32 steering rack and adopted a rack-and-pinion type.
 
In May 1985, the Grand Extra Limited edition was released. Detail improvements were made in October 1985 and January 1986.

In October 1986 there were mechanical changes along with significant modifications to the exterior. There was a new turbocharged DOHC engine, the 2.0-liter RB20DET 24-valve six-cylinder, while the LD28 diesel engine was replaced by the new RD28-series six-cylinder diesel engine.

In May 1987 the "Grande Extra White Special" edition was release. In August of the same year, the Grande Touring Limited was added to lineup.
 
In February 1988 there was an improved and some 20 releases Super medalist anniversary special edition. In May 1988, the "White Limited" model was released. In September of the same year, the Super Series Selection was added to the lineup. In December private car and driving school versions were discontinued, leaving only taxis and other commercial models. In January 1989 Laurels with an automatic gearbox received a shift lock.
 
The taxi/commercial versions of the fifth generation were finally discontinued in July 1993, when they were replaced by the Nissan Crew.

Sixth generation (C33; 1989–1993) 

In December 1988, the C33 Laurel was announced. A month later, in January 1989, the C33 went on sale, originally only available as a hardtop four-door. The base engine offering again was a 1.8-litre four, the available options consisted of a 2-litre six (SOHC, DOHC or DOHC Turbo) and a 2.8-litre diesel inline-six. Early in 1991 a DOHC 2.5-litre inline-six coupled to a five-speed automatic became available.

The Nissan Laurel used a rear-wheel drive layout, making it a popular car to modify for drifting use. The C33 in particular is very popular as a drift car, because it has the same floor plan as the Nissan A31 Cefiro and the four-door Nissan Skyline R32. They also have many interchangeable parts which makes them ideal for modification. Suspension parts are identical to the Nissan Silvia S13 model.

The Toyota competitor was the Cresta, and there was also the new Honda Inspire in the same segment. The Laurel was repositioned slightly higher as a larger luxury sedan, as its exterior dimensions matched with the more senior Nissan Cedric and Nissan Gloria which were exclusive to separate Japanese Nissan dealerships (Nissan Bluebird for the Cedric, Nissan Prince for the Gloria). The Laurel was exclusive to Japanese dealership Nissan Motor Store locations.

Trim levels included the Medalist, Medalist Club S and Gran Limited. The Club S was the only C33 Laurel with the RB25DE option and a front lip spoiler, with other models offering only the RB20, CA18, and RD28 engines.

V6 engines were no longer available; instead, the RB20E type (SOHC), RB20DE type (DOHC), RB20DET type (single turbo DOHC) series 6-cylinder 2.0L, CA18i series four-cylinder SOHC1.8L and RD28-series six-cylinder diesel engines were offered. In addition to this, the improved HICAS-II suspension configuration was used. Four-cylinder model (CA18i) series and six-cylinder diesel engine (RD28) in the presence and instruction car specifications.
 
In January 1991, the Laurel was facelifted and a new RB20E/RB20DE-powered 5-speed AT model crept into the range. Also in November 1991, 3-series cars RB25DE Catalogue DOHC2.5L add a grade-six-cylinder engine. 2.5L existing and additional models equipped with previous-generations high-mount side lamp, side-door airbags. Organizing models in the senior grades.

In the North American market, this was only sold in parts of the Caribbean, primarily the Bahamas under the Nissan Laurel Altima.  However, the Altima name was first used in the United States & Canada starting in the 1993 model year for its new compact car, which has since become a mid-size in 2002.
  
By January 1992 cumulative production achieved 2 million units.

Seventh generation (C34; 1993–1997) 

The new Laurel C34 was released in January 1993. To meet stricter side impact legislation it was no longer available in a pillarless hardtop sedan configuration; the single body style offered was a regular saloon with B-posts. Gone as well was the four-cylinder engine. Available engines included a 2.0 L six (SOHC or DOHC), a 2.5 L DOHC six, and a 2.8 L diesel six. The diesel engine now had three valves per cylinder, for a total of 18. A wider and longer body meant that there was no longer a compact sedan version on offer. Under Japanese vehicle classification regulations all Laurels were now in the large car category due to vehicle length and width were no longer in compliance, even those models with engines displacing less than 2000 cc. Japanese owners were now liable for additional taxes paid yearly in addition to standard registration, road tax, and inspection costs. Large cars have a leading "3" at the top of the license plate, while compact cars have a "5". Manufacturing was transferred to the Murayama plant. The smaller Laurel Spirit was replaced by the all-new Nissan Presea.

Some of the later models featured more sophistication such as Nissan's proprietary 4-wheel steering (HICAS) and 4-wheel drive (ATTESA) systems, which were taken from the Skyline models. The Laurel also offered ASCD (auto speed control) with steering wheel switches on the top-of-the-line Medalist VG Selection. The S Club has electrical Super HICAS and ABS brakes. A 5-speed manual transmission was only available in the Medalist diesel version, with no manually shifted gasoline cars offered. Diesels and single-cam gasoline cars received four-speed automatics; more powerful gasoline cars all got a five-speed automatic. To add a European luxury feel, the door handle design was changed to a pull-type.

In May 1993 an RB20E-engined Club S was added, as the 2.5-only Club S was not a strong seller. In July and August 1993 special editions were launched to celebrate Nissan's 60th anniversary, the Medalist S 60th Anniversary and the Club SJ 60th Anniversary respectively.
 

January 1994 saw a mid-life facelift for the C34 Laurel. Medalist versions received a center grille finisher, while the Club S received a sportier looking grille and an exclusive front bumper design, necessitating other minor changes around the front end. Medalist and Club S specifications were more differentiated than before. The Club S also received a new engine, the turbocharged 24-valve DOHC RB25DET straight-six, while the 24-valve RB20DE model was discontinued. The turbo version received a four-speed automatic, as the engine produces too much torque for the five-speed JATCO RE5R01A. The new Club S Type X was a more expensive version, while the regular Club S received a few downgrades, such as a Premium Tricot interior rather than the earlier Ultrasuede which was now only a cost option on the Type X. The Medalist J and the basic Grand Cruise model were replaced by the Medalist L and the Grand Saloon. Minor cost cutting led to Medalists using wheel trims shared with other Nissan automobiles, while the stereo head was changed from a Laurel-only dedicated size to a single DIN regular format.

The Laurel underwent a minor change in September 1994, with a significant rear end redesign. Front end design remained largely untouched, while a driver's SRS airbag became standard fitment across the board. New was the first four-wheel-drive Laurel, and a Medalist Turbo model. The Medalist Turbo received the same sporty-looking front end as the Club S. In January 1995 a new well-equipped submodel appeared, the Club S Selection. In September 1995 another special edition appeared, the 20E-engined Medalist Dual Limited.

A final update took place in May 1996. The steering wheel design was changed and a passenger airbag became standard. More special editions also appeared, in the form of the "Cellencia" which received dedicated seat fabric and a unique grille, as well as tinted window glass. In February 1997, the ABS-equipped Cellencia SV and Cellencia Medalist SV appeared. Production ended in May 1997 with sales continuing from stock until the eighth generation Laurel replaced it.

Eighth generation (C35; 1997–2002) 

The eighth and last generation debuted in June 1997. The number of available models was further reduced; the models had a DOHC two-liter engine, a 2.5 L six, or a 2.8 L diesel six. In late 2002 Laurel production was ended. The competitors were the Toyota Cresta and the Honda Inspire. In this generation, no manual transmission was offered anymore. It was replaced in 2003 by the Nissan Teana.

See also 
Nissan Laurel Spirit
Nissan Skyline - sister car
Nissan Cefiro
Nissan Teana - successor
Toyota Mark II - competing model
Nissan Note - the second-generation top version has reintroduced the "Medalist" badge

References

 Automobil Revue, catalogue editions 1969, 1973, 1975, 1979, 2001.

External links
 Nissan Heritage Collection
 Nissan Laurel Club, in Russian

Laurel
All-wheel-drive vehicles
Luxury vehicles
Vehicles with four-wheel steering
Cars introduced in 1968
Rear-wheel-drive vehicles
Production electric cars
Laurel
Electric cars
1970s cars
1980s cars
1990s cars
2000s cars